Pseudocoremia fluminea is a species of moth in the family Geometridae. It is endemic to New Zealand. It is classified as Not Threatened by the Department of Conservation.

Taxonomy 
This species was first described by Alfred Philpott in 1926 and named Selidosema fluminea. Philpott and Stewart Lindsay discovered this species at Flora River on the track to Mount Arthur tableland at an altitude of approximately 1000m. In 1928, in his book The Butterflies and Moths of New Zealand, George Hudson discussed the species as a synonym of Selidosema productata.  Later in 1928 Philpott stated that the moth he described in 1926 was a separate species explaining that although both productata and fluminea were variable, fluminea could be distinguished from the former species by its shorter antennal pectinations and the difference in the male genitalia. Hudson accepted this and discussed and illustrated the species under the name S. fluminea in his 1939 publication A supplement to the butterflies and moths of New Zealand. In 1988 John S. Dugdale assigned the species to the genus Pseudocoremia. The hototype specimen is held at the New Zealand Arthropod Collection.

Description  
Philpott described the adult male of the species as follows:

Distribution 
This species is endemic to New Zealand. This species is found all through northwest Nelson to Stockton Plateau. This species has also been recorded in north Canterbury on black beech.

Biology and host species 
This species is on the wing in January. The host species of the larvae of this moth is unknown. Adult moths frequent blossoms of Olearia and Hoheria galbrata. P. fluminea is itself a host for a species of wasp within the genus Dolichogenidea.

Conservation status 
This species has been classified under the New Zealand Threat Classification system as being Not Threatened.

References

Boarmiini
Moths of New Zealand
Endemic fauna of New Zealand
Moths described in 1926
Endemic moths of New Zealand